The Welldeserved Fox is a 1959 Vietnamese animated film, directed by Lê Minh Hiền and Trương Qua.

Plot
Film based on poem The fox and the hive (Con cáo và tổ ong) by Hồ Chí Minh.

In the forest lived Bear and Chicken farming. Once, Chicken was enticed by Fox's cries pretending to be a Rabbit to play with Chicken. The Fox tries to eat the Chicken, but the Chicken luckily escapes to a nearby tree. The Bear thought the Chicken dead, eaten by the Fox, and mourns the loss of Chicken with the Bees. 

Bear inadvertently sets a trap for the Fox, which was successful, and the Bees manage to chase and apprehend the Fox. Then, Bear and Bees discover that Chicken is still alive. They rejoice together in the end: the Chicken is watering the Flower, the Bear is tending the Flower, whilst the Bees draw pollen from the Flower, all working together in harmony.

Production
The Welldeserved Fox was known as the first animated film of the North Vietnam.

By first plan, the film would has the 300m length on 10 minutes, 15 thousand drawings on the 18x24cm size of cellophane. But Vietnamese infrastructures could not response, then drawers used typewriter papers which were soaked oil. Besides, their "desks" were glass windows what were in Vietnam Animation Studio's house on Hoàng Hoa Thám Street (Hanoi).
 Animators : Lê Minh Hiền, Trương Qua, Hồ Quảng...

Award
 Golden Lotus prize at the Vietnam Film Festival II (1973) for the best artists (Hồ Quảng and Trương Qua).

See also
 History of Vietnamese animation

References

 Chỗ đứng nào cho phim hoạt hình Việt ?
 Phim hoạt hình Việt Nam "tỉnh giấc" ?
 Khoảng trống phim hoạt hình Việt Nam

Vietnamese animated films
Films based on works by Vietnamese writers
1959 animated films
1959 films